Bella Bell-Gam (born August 24, 1956, in Rivers State) is a retired Nigerian pentathlete.

Career
Bell-Gam was born in Opobo Town, Rivers State, she has a twin sister, Judy who was also an athlete. Both sisters attended Government Primary School, Afikpo, Methodist School, Uwani, Enugu and Union Secondary School, Ikot Ekpene. The girls where in Enugu when the Civil War broke out and moved southwards to Nnewi. At the end of the war, Bell-Gam returned to school in Ikot Ekpene. In 1973, she represented her school in high jump at the Hussey Shield and Lady Manuwa competitions. At the 2nd National Sports Festival in 1975, she switched to hurdles and won gold in her event. After secondary education, she attended Calabar College of Technology and represented the college at the NIPOGA games participating in the hurdles, high jump and long jump events. In the 3rd National Sports Festival, she chose to focus on high jump and long jump. From there, she was selected to represent the country in the Ecowas games and later at the All Africa Games. 
She won the gold medal in the 1978 All Africa Games held in Algiers, Algeria with 3709 points. She also won bronze medals in the 100m hurdles and long jump during the same competition achieving a time & distance of 13.99s and 6.12m respectively.

References

Living people
1956 births
People from Opobo
Sportswomen from Rivers State
Nigerian pentathletes
Nigerian female long jumpers
African Games gold medalists for Nigeria
African Games bronze medalists for Nigeria
African Games medalists in athletics (track and field)
Athletes (track and field) at the 1978 All-Africa Games